Wout François Maria Weghorst (born 7 August 1992) is a Dutch professional footballer who plays as a striker for  club Manchester United, on loan from EFL Championship club Burnley, and the Netherlands national team.

Weghorst began his professional career in the second tier of Dutch football with Emmen. He then played in the Eredivisie with Heracles Almelo and AZ, before joining VfL Wolfsburg in 2018. After scoring 70 goals in 144 games for Wolfsburg, he was signed by Burnley in January 2022 for a fee of £12 million. After the club were relegated from the Premier League, Weghorst had loan spells at Turkish Süper Lig club Beşiktaş and Manchester United.

Weghorst made one appearance for the Netherlands under-21 team in 2014, before making his senior international debut in March 2018. He represented the Netherlands at UEFA Euro 2020 and the 2022 FIFA World Cup, where he scored two goals in the quarter-final match against Argentina.

Club career

Early career
Born in Borne, Overijssel, Weghorst started his career at local clubs RKSV NEO and DETO Twenterand, before joining Eredivisie club Willem II in 2011. Despite having the opportunity to make his way into the first-team, he never broke through, and only featured for the reserve team. He signed for Eerste Divisie club Emmen in 2012. He made his debut on 10 August 2012, in a match against Dordrecht which ended 1–1. Weghorst would go on the score his first goal in professional football a month later, in the derby against Veendam, a match that ended in a 2–1 win for Emmen. He managed to play in 28 league matches in his debut season, scoring 8 goals. After his spell with Emmen, Weghorst signed a contract with Eredivisie club Heracles Almelo on a free transfer.

On 9 August, Weghorst made his Eredivisie debut for Heracles Almelo, in a 0–3 home loss against AZ in the Polman Stadion. He was a regular starter in his two years in Almelo. In the first season the club battled relegation from the Eredivisie, but his second season was more successful with Heracles ending in the sixth spot and, through the subsequent play-offs, the club qualified for the Europa League qualifying round – the first time in Heracles Almelo history that the club qualified for an international competition.

AZ

After the successful season with Heracles, Weghorst signed a four-year contract with AZ in July 2016, with the option for an extra year. On 24 November 2016 he scored his first European goal which proved to be the winning goal in a 0–1 win in a UEFA Europa League group match against Irish team Dundalk.

He was appointed ahead of the season as vice-captain to Ron Vlaar. Weghorst started the 2017–18 season with good form, displayed by 7 goals in his first 13 starts. He continued that form and after scoring 20 goals in 29 appearances in all competitions, he earned his first full international call-up in Ronald Koeman's first Dutch squad in March 2018.

He finished the season joint third top scorer in the Eredivisie with 18 goals with Steven Berghuis, both behind top scorer Alireza Jahanbakhsh (with 21) and runner up Bjørn Johnsen (with 19). Weghorst also had six assists.

VfL Wolfsburg
On 26 June 2018, Weghorst signed a four-year contract with Bundesliga club VfL Wolfsburg. On 16 March 2019, he scored his first hat-trick for Wolfsburg, and first by any player for the club since Mario Gómez in April 2017, in a 5–2 league win over Fortuna Düsseldorf. He finished his first season in Germany with 17 goals, ranking joint-third in the Bundesliga goalscoring charts for the 2018–19 campaign.

In the 2019–20 season, Weghorst produced another impressive goal return, scoring 16 times in the league as Wolfsburg finished 6th.

Weghorst scored twice in the 2020–21 Europa League qualifying rounds, but Wolfsburg ultimately failed to qualify for the group stage, losing to Greek team AEK Athens in the playoff round.

Burnley 
On 31 January 2022, Weghorst signed a three-and-a-half-year contract with English Premier League club Burnley for a fee of £12 million. Weghorst made his debut for the club on 5 February, playing the full 90 minutes in a 0–0 draw with Watford at Turf Moor. Weghorst scored his first goal for the club on 19 February in a 3–0 win against Brighton & Hove Albion, helping to end an eleven game winless run for his new club. His second Burnley goal came on 17 April, in a 1–1 draw against West Ham United.

Loan to Beşiktaş
On 5 July 2022, Weghorst signed for Süper Lig club Beşiktaş on loan until the end of the 2022–23 season. He made his Süper Lig debut on 6 August in a 1–0 home win against Kayserispor. He scored his first league goal on 21 August, with the opening goal against Fatih Karagümrük in a 4–1 win for Beşiktaş. On 7 January 2023, he scored a goal in his last match for Beşiktaş which ended in a 2–1 victory over Kasımpaşa.

Loan to Manchester United
His loan to Beşiktaş was cancelled in January 2023, ahead of a loan to Manchester United, with a £3 million loan fee being split between Burnley and Beşiktaş. On 13 January, Weghorst signed for United on loan until the end of the season, as part of a transfer merry-go-round involving United, Beşiktaş and Al Nassr for Weghorst, Vincent Aboubakar and Cristiano Ronaldo. He was given the number 27 shirt most recently worn by Alex Telles.

On 18 January, he made his debut by starting in a 1–1 away draw against Crystal Palace. On 25 January, he scored his first goal for United in a 3–0 away win over Nottingham Forest in the EFL Cup semi-final first leg. On 26 February, he played in the 2023 EFL Cup final and assisted Marcus Rashford for United’s second goal of the match in their 2–0 victory over Newcastle United. It was the first time in his career that he had won a trophy. On 9 March, he scored his first goal at Old Trafford in a 4–1 win against Real Betis in the Europa League round of 16.

International career
Weghorst made his debut for the Netherlands under-21 team on 14 October 2014, scoring against Portugal in a 5–4 defeat. This was his only appearance for the under-21 team.

He earned his first full international call-up in Ronald Koeman's first Dutch squad in March 2018. He made his senior international debut in a friendly against England on 23 March at the Amsterdam Arena.

Weghorst was selected in the Netherlands squad for UEFA Euro 2020, and scored against Ukraine in their opening group game.

In November 2022, Weghorst was chosen as a member of the Dutch squad for the 2022 World Cup in Qatar. In the quarter-final match against Argentina, he came on as a late substitute and scored two goals, with the equaliser being scored in the 11th minute of added time from a free-kick routine similar to a goal with Wolfsburg against Arminia Bielefeld in 2020, to draw the game at 2–2 and send it into extra time and an eventual penalty shootout. Despite scoring his penalty, the Netherlands were eliminated as they lost 4–3 in the shootout.

Style of play
At , Weghorst commonly plays as a striker, in particular a 'target man' role, due to his aerial dominance and ability to hold up the play. He is renowned as a goal poacher, with good reactive finishing inside the penalty area, but also regularly drops deep to help link play. In the 2021–22 Premier League season, Weghorst averaged more presses per 90 minutes than any other player. His style of play has been compared to that of Edin Džeko.

Career statistics

Club

International

Netherlands score listed first, score column indicates score after each Weghorst goal.

Honours
Manchester United
EFL Cup: 2022–23

References

External links

Profile at the Beşiktaş J.K. website
Profile at the Royal Dutch Football Association website (in Dutch)

1992 births
Living people
People from Borne, Overijssel
Footballers from Overijssel
Dutch footballers
Association football forwards
DETO Twenterand players
Willem II (football club) players
FC Emmen players
Heracles Almelo players
AZ Alkmaar players
VfL Wolfsburg players
Burnley F.C. players
Beşiktaş J.K. footballers
Manchester United F.C. players
Eredivisie players
Eerste Divisie players
Bundesliga players
Premier League players
Süper Lig players
Netherlands under-21 international footballers
Netherlands international footballers
UEFA Euro 2020 players
2022 FIFA World Cup players
Dutch expatriate footballers
Expatriate footballers in England
Expatriate footballers in Germany
Expatriate footballers in Turkey
Dutch expatriate sportspeople in England
Dutch expatriate sportspeople in Germany
Dutch expatriate sportspeople in Turkey